Nepal participated in the first edition of SAG, 1984 South Asian Games at Dasarath Stadium, Kathmandu, Nepal from 17 to 23 September 1984. A total of 105 competitors representing Nepal, participated in the games. Nepal was the host of the first South Asian Games. It finished fourth at the medal tally with a total medals count of 24 including 4 golds, 12 silvers and 8 bronzes.

Medalists 
Ashok Kumar Karki was a double medalist from Nepal in two events of Weightlifting. Medalists representing Nepal are as follows:

Medals by Sports

See also 

 Nepal at the South Asian Games

References 

Nations at the South Asian Games
South Asian Games